Melesha Katrina O'Garro  (born 2nd August 1987), known professionally as Lady Leshurr, is a British rapper, singer, songwriter and producer. She is known for her Queen's Speech series of freestyles, the fourth of which became popular in 2016. Her subsequent freestyle, Queen's Speech 5, was called "brilliant" and "2015's crowning freestyle" by Spin. In 2021, she entered the Channel 4 series The Celebrity Circle for Stand Up to Cancer, catfishing as Big Narstie, and won. She also competed in the thirteenth series of Dancing on Ice, where she reached the semi-final.

Early life
Melesha Katrina O'Garro was born on 15 December 1987 to Kittitian parents. She became interested in poetry and writing at the age of six, but decided that writing music would bring her to a wider audience. She released her first mixtape at the age of fourteen. In her words:

Career
Leshurr played one of the lead female roles in Vertigo Films' 2009 film 1 Day. In 2010 Leshurr's first television music video appearance came in the music video 'Game Over Female Takeover', featuring Amplify Dot, Mz Bratt, Ruff Diamondz and others. The music video was directed by Nick Donnelly and produced by Carla Marie Williams. Leshurr won second place in the Best Female category of the Official Mixtape Awards 2011. To complement the music releases, she has designed a range of merchandise, the "Friggin L" clothing line named after her 2011 mixtape Friggin L.

In 2016, she won the MOBO Award, celebrating excellence in black music, for Best Female Act. In 2019, she won the award for "Best Rap / Grime Act" and in 2020 she won "Best Solo Female" at the Birmingham Music Awards. In 2019, Leshurr performed at The Nicki Wrld Tour in Birmingham and Manchester as a special guest for rapper Nicki Minaj. 

She was awarded the British Empire Medal (BEM) in the 2020 Birthday Honours for services to music and charity. 

In 2020, she appeared in a commercial advertising for beauty brand Olay and became the first Black British woman to lead a campaign for the company. 

In late 2020, it was announced that Lady Leshurr would be joining the line-up at BBC Radio 1Xtra with her own Saturday afternoon radio show. In February 2023, it was announced that she would be replaced by Joelah Noble as presenter of the Saturday afternoon show.

In 2021, she appeared as a contestant on the thirteenth series of Dancing on Ice, partnered with Brendyn Hatfield. After surviving three skate-offs during the competition, Leshurr was eliminated in the semi-final, leaving her in fourth place. She also won The Celebrity Circle for Stand Up to Cancer. 

In 2021, Leshurr announced a partnership with Kamo Premium Vodka, through which she became a co-owner.

In April and August 2022, Leshurr appeared as a guest panellist on the ITV show Loose Women.

Influences
Leshurr has named Ashley Walters, Eminem, Busta Rhymes, Ms. Dynamite, Missy Elliott and Lil Wayne as her primary influences. Nia Kay, a competitor on The Rap Game season 2, stated that Leshurr was one of her influences due to her uniqueness and rap skill.

Personal life
Leshurr came out as pansexual in September 2018. 

In late 2019 Leshurr took time out from her music career following the death of her sister from breast cancer.

On 22 October 2022, Leshurr and Sherelle Smith allegedly assaulted Leshurr's ex-girlfriend and the woman's new girlfriend. She was charged with two counts of assault occasioning actual bodily harm, and Smith was charged with one count of the same offence. Both women pleaded not guilty to their charges and were bailed.

Discography

Mixtapes

Extended plays

Singles

As lead artist

As featured artist

Guest appearances

Filmography

Film
 1 Day (2009) – Shakia
 Lapse of Honour (2015) – Eve
 The Intent 2: The Come Up (2018) – Cameo Role On the Other Foot (2021) – Therese

Television
 Later...With Jools Holland (2018) – Musical guest
 Sunday Brunch (2018) – Musical guest
 Don't Hate the Playaz (2018–) – Team captain
 The X Factor UK (2018) – Musical guest
 Happy Hour with Olly Murs (2018) – Musical guest
 The Big Narstie Show (2018) - Guest
 I'm A Celebrity: Extra Camp (2018) – Guest panelist
 The Rap Game UK (2019) – Special guest judge
 CelebAbility (2019) – Contestant
 Even Later...with Jools Holland & Lady Leshurr (2019) – Special guest co-host
 Celebrity MasterChef (2020) – ContestantGhost Bus Tours (2020) – Participant
 Shopping with Keith Lemon (2020) – Guest
I'm A Celebrity: The Daily Drop (2020) – Guest Panelist
Steph's Packed Lunch (2020) –Guest Co-host
 Dancing on Ice (2021) – Contestant – Semi- Finalist
 The Celebrity Circle (2021) – Contestant – Winner
 CelebAbility (2021) – Contestant
 Michael McIntyre’s The Wheel (2021) – Contestant
 The Hit List (2021) – Contestant
 Blankety Blank (2021) – Contestant
I Like The Way U Move (2021) – Guest judge
Rock of All Ages (2021) – Mentor – TBA
 Taskmaster New Year Treat II (2022) – Contestant
 Would I Lie to You? (2022) - Contestant
 Rock Till We Drop'' (2022) - Presenter
 Loose Women (2022) - Guest Panellist (4 episodes)

References

External links
 

1987 births
Black British women rappers
21st-century Black British women singers
British hip hop singers
English people of Saint Kitts and Nevis descent
Grime music artists
Living people
English LGBT musicians
LGBT rappers
British LGBT singers
Recipients of the British Empire Medal
Pansexual musicians
LGBT Black British people